Airphil Express served the following airports:

Asia

East Asia
Hong Kong
Hong Kong International Airport

Southeast Asia
Malaysia
Kuala Lumpur - Kuala Lumpur International Airport
Sandakan - Sandakan Airport 
Philippines
Luzon
Busuanga - Francisco B. Reyes Airport 
Legazpi City - Legazpi Airport
Manila - Ninoy Aquino International Airport Main hub
Masbate - Moises R. Espinosa Airport
Naga - Naga Airport
Puerto Princesa - Puerto Princesa International Airport
Tuguegarao - Tuguegarao Airport
Mindanao
Butuan - Bancasi Airport
Cagayan de Oro - Lumbia Airport
Cotabato - Awang Airport
Davao - Francisco Bangoy International Airport Hub
Dipolog - Dipolog Airport
General Santos - General Santos International Airport
Jolo - Jolo Airport
Ozamiz - Labo Airport
Surigao - Surigao Airport
Tawi-Tawi - Sanga-Sanga Airport
Zamboanga - Zamboanga International Airport Hub
Visayas
Bacolod - Bacolod–Silay International Airport
Calbayog - Calbayog Airport
Catarman - Catarman National Airport
Caticlan - Godofredo P. Ramos Airport
Cebu - Mactan–Cebu International Airport Hub
Dumaguete - Sibulan Airport
Iloilo - Iloilo International Airport
Kalibo - Kalibo International Airport
Roxas City - Roxas Airport 
Tacloban - Daniel Z. Romualdez Airport 
Singapore
Changi Airport

Terminated destinations
Asia
Brunei - Bandar Seri Begawan
People's Republic of China - Guangzhou, Shenzhen
South Korea - Cheongju, Daegu, Gwangju
Philippines - Clark, Laoag City, San Jose (Occidental Mindoro), Subic Bay, Tagbilaran City
Indonesia - Bali (Denpasar)

See also
Philippine Airlines destinations

References

Lists of airline destinations